James Oldham (23 June 1801 – 10 June 1890) was a British civil engineer, involved in the reclamation of Sunk Island in the East Riding of Yorkshire, as well as a number of dock and other civil engineering schemes in and around Kingston upon Hull.

Biography 

James Oldham was born in Kingston upon Hull, England, on 23 June 1801. At the age of 14, he went to sea, spending time on ships in the Baltic; however, the life of a seaman prove too much for him and he later returned to England, and joined his father, a millwright, as apprentice, learning mechanical engineering.

One of Oldham's first contracts for was for the upgrade of the North Bridge on the River Hull in 1832, for the Hull Corporation, on which he acted as superintending engineer.

In 1835, he prepared a plan for the conversion of the Old Harbour, Hull, in 1835, a design for a West Dock for Thomas Thompson, published in 1836; and a plan for a dock in the east of Hull for the Queen's Dock Company in 1838. He also was engineer for a number of proposed railways : the Hull and Gainsborough (New Holland to Gainsborough) of 1844, the 1845 Hull and Barnsley Junction scheme, the 1866 Hull and West Yorkshire and Lancashire, and the 1884 Hull and Lincoln railway. He also was an engineer on the Hull and Leeds (1835) (Hull to Selby), and Hull and Hornsea Railways.

In 1874, he entered into partnership with George Bohn; the firm acted under James Abernethy during the construction of the Alexandra Dock of the Hull and Barnsley Railway in the 1880s.

Oldhan was a founder of the Hull Mechanic's Institute, and a regular and reliable witness to Committees of the Houses of Parliament.

He died on 10 June 1890, of congestion of the lungs.

Published works

References

Sources 

 
 
 

1801 births
1890 deaths
English civil engineers
Engineers from Kingston upon Hull
Institution of Civil Engineers